High Heels is a 1991 melodrama film written and directed by Pedro Almodóvar and starring Victoria Abril, Marisa Paredes and Miguel Bosé. The plot follows the fractured relationship between a self-involved mother, a famous torch singer, and her grown daughter she had abandoned as a child. The daughter, who works as a television newscaster, has married her mother's ex-lover and has befriended a female impersonator. A murder further complicates this web of relationships.

The film has the feel of other mother–daughter melodramas like Stella Dallas (1937), Mildred Pierce (1945), Imitation of Life (1959) and particularly Autumn Sonata (1978), which is quoted directly in the film.

Despite mixed reviews, the film was a commercial success. It was selected as the Spanish entry for the Best Foreign Language Film at the 64th Academy Awards, but was not accepted as a nominee.

Plot
Rebeca, a television news broadcaster, waits anxiously at a Madrid airport for the return of her mother, Becky del Páramo, a famous torch singer, who is returning to Spain after a fifteen-year stay in Mexico. While she is waiting, Rebeca recalls incidents from her early life when her mother, preoccupied with her career and romantic life, neglected and rejected her.

Rebeca has since become a newsreader for a television station owned by her husband Manuel. The intensity of the family reunion is heightened because, many years ago, Manuel was one of Becky's lovers. On the night of her return, Becky, Rebeca and Manuel have supper and then go out to see Letal, a female impersonator whose drag act is based on Becky. For some time, Rebeca has been coming to see the concerts whenever she misses her mother. Backstage, Rebeca helps Letal to remove his costume and, kneeling in front of him, she is impressed by his manhood. Letal takes advantage of the situation and they make love. Manuel, who no longer loves his wife, wants to sleep with Becky again and divorce Rebeca.

A month later, Manuel is murdered in his villa. He had spent the evening first with his mistress Isabel (also Rebeca's sign language interpreter on the news) and then with Becky who, having become his lover again, had come to announce it was over between them because she had learnt about his other mistress. It was Rebeca who discovered the body. The investigating magistrate, Judge Domínguez, knows that their relationship has not recovered since Rebeca found out Becky was seeing Manuel, and centres his suspicions on both mother and daughter.

On the day of Manuel's funeral, Rebeca confesses to his murder live on television, while reading the news. She is immediately imprisoned, but the investigating judge seems desperate to prove her innocence despite all the evidence. Becky makes her return to the Madrid stage while Rebeca spends her first night in prison. In jail, she listens on the radio as her mother dedicates the first songs of her triumphant concert performance to Rebeca. A social worker, Paula, takes a special interest in Rebeca; like her, she is heartbroken, grieving the loss of her boyfriend Hugo. Rebeca sees a nude picture of Hugo that Paula carries with her, and thinks that Letal and Hugo are the same person.

The judge arranges for Becky to see her daughter, and Rebeca now denies the murder of Manuel. Mother and daughter confess their lack of love, their jealousy, and their secrets to each other. Rebeca draws a comparison between herself and the daughter in the film Autumn Sonata, in which the girl's mother, an outstanding pianist, asks her to play the piano and then humiliates her by telling her how to improve her performance. Rebeca suggests that she too has always felt inferior to Becky, and has been forced to compete with her, winning only once by marrying Manuel. But even this victory was finally denied her, when Becky started an affair with Manuel. Rebeca admits that fifteen years ago, her desire to be closer to Becky led her to murder her stepfather, and also played some part in her murder of Manuel, whom she saw as usurping her mother's affection. The extent of Rebeca's fixation and the limitlessness of her adoration are too much for Becky's frail heart, and her condition worsens. Back in prison, Rebeca discovers she is pregnant – carrying Letal's child. At once, the judge releases her from prison despite the lack of any fresh evidence.

Rebeca goes to see Letal's final drag performance. In the dressing room, she discovers that he is the judge, with Letal being one of his disguises and Hugo being another. He explains that his dressing up was just an investigative strategy and, knowing about her pregnancy, asks her to marry him. As Rebeca struggles to take this in, they see a television broadcast relating to Becky's sudden heart attack. They rush to the hospital, where Rebeca confesses to murdering Manuel, but Becky decides to take the blame in order for her daughter to go free. When Becky is taken home to die, Rebeca gives her the gun and Becky leaves her fingerprints on it, thereby incriminating herself and establishing Rebeca's innocence. When Rebeca hears the high heels of the women passing in the street, she tells her mother the sound reminds her of her mother coming home when she was little. She turns around, and realises her mother has died while she was talking.

Cast

Production
High Heels was an interpretative tour de force for two essential actresses of the "Almodovarian universe": Marisa Paredes and Victoria Abril. The male lead was difficult to cast. The actor had to be believable in drag and as a judge. The role eventually went to Miguel Bosé, a famous singer in Spain and Latin America. His casting was a cause célèbre of the film publicity.

Genre
High Heels is a melodrama, though its composite narrative (the poster image of a high-heeled shoe, which is also a gun) testifies to the combination of two genres, melodrama and crime thriller. The themes are typical of melodrama: family relations dominate the story-line, as do relationships between men and women. The narrative charts the reuniting of a long-absent mother with her daughter, and their competition over men (one man in particular) and professional success. All the characters have secrets that the viewer knows. The omniscient narration, typical of melodrama, allows suspense only in terms of how other characters react to revelations the viewer anticipates. For example, Becky conceals her heart condition from her daughter, Rebeca conceals the truth about murdering her husband, and the judge conceals his triple identity as Letal, Hugo and Judge Dominguez.

Thirty-five minutes in, a murder occurs, but the plot does not turn the picture into an investigative narrative. The story follows the conflict between mother and daughter, not the crime investigator. It is clear that Letal is the judge and that Rebeca probably killed her husband. The investigative role of Judge Dominguez is further undermined by the fact that his motivation is love for the murderess Rebeca, rather than solving the crime.

Music
The combined effects of voice, music and lyrics is one of the most prominent features of Almodóvar as a filmmaker. He finds his most significant musical economy in the highly expressive boleros, which are at the forefront in this film. Almodóvar explained that he listened to an enormous number of songs to find those he used in the film. He finally chose "Piensa en Mí" and "Un Año De Amor". His idea was to find songs that would correspond to a singer such as Becky del Páramo, both at the start and at the end of her career. "Piensa en Mí" is a very famous song in Mexico, composed by Agustín Lara and sung by Lola Beltrán. Almodóvar eventually chose a version by Chavela Vargas, sung as a lament. "Un año de amor", which Letal sings in playback during his performance, is a French song by Nino Ferrer. There is a famous Italian version sung by Mina, for which Almodóvar rewrote the lyrics in Spanish.

Once the two songs were chosen, Almodóvar had to find a voice that suited Becky del Páramo. After trying several voices, he found that of Luz Casal fitted the appearance of Marisa Paredes. Casal, famous in Spain as a rock singer, accepted Almodóvar's offer and the two songs became her most successful. "Piensa en mí" and "Un año de amor", the songs that Casal performed for the film, were both included on her album A contraluz, released in 1991.

The film also contains an unexpected prison yard dance sequence in reference to famous musicals shot in fake prisons, such as Jailhouse Rock (1957) with Elvis Presley and John Waters' Cry-Baby (1990). The song used in High Heels is a merengue: "Pecadora" by Los Hermanos Rosario.

The score, which Almodóvar did not like, was composed by Ryuichi Sakamoto. For the title sequence and Rebeca's second confession, Almodóvar used pieces composed by Miles Davis in the 1960s, which were inspired by flamenco. The first piece, heard while Rebeca is alone waiting for her mother, is called "Solea", meaning 'solitude' in Andalusian. After her second confession to Judge Dominguez, when Rebeca goes to the cemetery to throw a handful of earth on her husband's coffin, we hear the second piece, "Saeta", by Gil Evans, from his Sketches of Spain album.

Almodóvar also used two themes composed by George Fenton for Dangerous Liaisons (1988). They are heard when Rebeca leaves prison and goes home, and when she returns to prison in the van.

Title
The original title is Tacones lejanos, which can be translated as Distant Heels and refers to Rebeca's childhood, when she was unable to sleep until her mother entered her bedroom and Rebeca managed to hear the sound of her mother's heels as she left, walking down the hallway. The inaccuracy of the English translation of the title affected the reception of the film, as the English High Heels suggests stylish comedy, whereas the Spanish Distant Heels conveys a feeling of family melodrama. The Spanish title Distant Heels is a reference to Raoul Walsh's film Distant Drums (1951).

Release
High Heels, Almodóvar's ninth film, was co-produced by El Deseo and Ciby 2000 and released in Spain in October 1991. It was enormously successful in Spain. By the end of 1991, it had attracted an audience of more than 1.5 million, and eventually it came second, in terms of box-office takings, to Women on the Verge of a Nervous Breakdown (1988) among Almodóvar's films released up to that point.

High Heels has been released on DVD in Region 2, but never issued in Region 1 (US). It received a multi-region DVD release in Mexico in November 2012.

Critical reception
Spanish critics' reaction was hostile, on the whole. Writing in Dirigido Por, Antonio Castro felt that Almodóvar's desire to create a more straightforward narrative had merely led to a greater loss of vigor. Angel Fernandez Santos, in El País, concluded that, in comparison with Douglas Sirk's Imitation of Life (1959), which he regarded as an Everest, High Heels was a mere hill. In Expansión, Eduardo Torres-Dulce was firmly of the opinion that Almodóvar had had his day. David Thomson of Sight & Sound concluded that in general, High Heels did not measure up to much of Almodóvar's earlier work. For him, the homage to the other films – including Autumn Sonata – "is counter productive, for it merely suggests the inferiority of High Heels".

The film was very successful in Italy, and reviews were both heartfelt and moving. In France, the film was a huge success. It did not fare as well in other countries, such as Germany, where Almodóvar's films have not been well understood. He commented, "My films move very freely and to understand them one must simply allow one's intuition and sensibility free rein... I've never been asked so many irrational questions as in Germany".

It was less successful in the United States than many others of Almodóvar's films. As with Tie Me Up! Tie Me Down! (1989), High Heels was especially attacked on moral grounds, notably by certain women's groups. Almodóvar also complained that Miramax, the film's distributor in the United States, did not understand the film and had no idea what to do with it.

On the review aggregator website Rotten Tomatoes, the film holds an approval rating of 53% based on 15 reviews, with an average rating of 5.6/10. Metacritic, which uses a weighted average, assigned the film a score of 51 out of 100, based on 12 critics, indicating "mixed or average reviews". The New York Times critic Janet Maslin wrote that "High Heels has no real mirth and not even enough energy to keep it lively." Critic Roger Ebert gave the film three stars out of four, commenting that "Pedro Almodóvar's films are an acquired taste, and with High Heels I am at last beginning to acquire it".

Accolades
High Heels received a Golden Globe nomination for Best Foreign Language Film and Goya Award nominations for Costume Design, Editing, Make-Up and Hairstyles, Sound and Supporting Actress (Cristina Marcos). The film won:

 1991 César Awards as Best Foreign Film
 1992 Sant Jordi Awards for Best Spanish Actress

Analysis
The film, which Almodóvar eventually made, was not that which he had intended after completing Law of Desire in 1986. The intended film would have been a variation on the classic play The House of Bernarda Alba by García Lorca, and would have been set in rural Spain, not in Madrid. The story would have involved a domineering mother and her two daughters, both of whom leave home in order to escape her tyranny; the mother is subsequently thought to have perished in a fire, but continues to pursue one of the girls for fifteen years. The proposed film did not come to fruition, for a variety of reasons. Almodóvar turned instead to Women on the Verge of a Nervous Breakdown which could be conveniently shot in Madrid. When he eventually made High Heels, it was fundamentally different from his original idea. Only the title remained. The plot was developed around the idea of someone confessing a crime on a live television news bulletin.

High Heels relates to the American tradition of melodrama and the so-called 'woman's picture'. Imitation of Life (1959), directed by Douglas Sirk, was a major influence and there are some striking parallels between High Heels and Sirk's film. In both, the mother is a performer – Becky is a singer, while the Lana Turner character in Sirk's film is an actress – whose career takes precedence over a young daughter; mother and daughter are rivals over a man; both films begin with the child separated from her mother at a holiday resort; and at one point, Rebeca tells her mother to stop acting, a phrase borrowed from Sirk's film. Imitation of Life was both a remake and a reinterpretation of an earlier film – the 1934 version by John M. Stahl – and so High Heels is very much Almodóvar's own film, distinguished throughout by his particular style and concerns.

With its tense mother–daughter dynamic, it also pointedly nods to Michael Curtiz's Mildred Pierce (1945), though in that film it is the mother, a businesswoman, who obsessively loves her daughter. In Stella Dallas (1937), directed by King Vidor, the same kind of relationship is also prominent, though here, the mother Stella is neither an artist nor a businesswoman but a lower-class woman who has social aspirations for her daughter. It alludes both to the films made by Turner and Joan Crawford and to their lives, to the relationship between Turner, whose lover was killed by her daughter, and to the tumultuous relationship between Crawford and her daughter Christina.

See also
 List of submissions to the 64th Academy Awards for Best Foreign Language Film
 List of Spanish submissions for the Academy Award for Best Foreign Language Film

References

Bibliography

External links
 
 
 
 
 

1991 films
1991 drama films
1991 LGBT-related films
1990s Spanish-language films
Best Foreign Film César Award winners
Ciby 2000 films
Drag (clothing)-related films
El Deseo films
Films about mother–daughter relationships
Films about singers
Films about television people
Films directed by Pedro Almodóvar
Films produced by Agustín Almodóvar
Films scored by Ryuichi Sakamoto
Films set in Madrid
Films shot in Madrid
French drama films
French LGBT-related films
LGBT-related drama films
Murder mystery films
Spanish drama films
Spanish LGBT-related films
Spanish Sign Language films
Spanish-language French films
TF1 Films Production films
1990s French films
1990s Spanish films